Blackwater Lake is a lake in the Northwest Territories, Canada.

See also

List of lakes in the Northwest Territories

References

Lakes of the Northwest Territories